The Great Pretender is the twenty-sixth solo studio album by American entertainer Dolly Parton. It was released on January 23, 1984, by RCA Records. It is composed of covers of hits from the 1950s and 1960s.  The album was produced by Val Garay. It made heavy use of synthesizers and had a decidedly pop sound.  The first single, a remake of The Drifters' 1960 hit "Save the Last Dance for Me" was a top 10 country single for Parton in early 1984 and came close to making the pop Top 40 as well (#45). Dolly Parton's cover of the 1965 Petula Clark hit "Downtown" was the album's second single. The title song was originally a hit for The Platters in 1956.

In 1986, a remixed version of the track "We Had It All" was included on Think About Love, a compilation album of remixes of previously released Parton material; the song was released as a single in late 1986, and provided an additional top 30 single for Parton.

The Great Pretender was the first Dolly Parton album to be issued on the then-new CD format at the time of its release.

It was released digitally for the first time on 4 December 2015.

Track listing

Chart performance
Album

Album (Year-End)

Notes

External links
The Great Pretender at Dolly Parton On-Line

Dolly Parton albums
1984 albums
Albums produced by Val Garay
RCA Records albums
Covers albums